Guillermo "Memo" Rojas Jr. (born August 18, 1981) is a Mexican professional race car driver. Successful in American sports car racing, Rojas is a four-time series champion in the Rolex Sports Car Series, a three-time winner of the 24 Hours of Daytona, and a two-time European Le Mans Series champion. He is the first Mexican driver to win a major American racing championship.

Personal life
Rojas was born in 1981 in Mexico City, Mexico. He is son of the Mexican driver Guillermo Rojas Sr.

Career

Early career
Rojas began his racing career in 1993, racing karts; in 1996 he moved up to professional racing in the Mexican Formula Two series. Heading to the United States in 1997, he joined the Barber Dodge series, before returning to Mexico in 1998 to race for two years in the national Formula Three series.

Returning to the United States in 2000, he spent two years racing in the American Formula Ford 2000 series, before moving up to the Barber Dodge Pro Series for the 2002 and 2003 seasons, claiming two wins during his time in the series, and finishing second in the series championship in 2003. He then graduated to the European Formula Renault series with DAMS in 2004, scoring two top-five finishes over the course of the year. In 2005 he returned to the United States, racing in the Toyota Atlantic championship series for a single race at the Fundidora park circuit in Monterrey.

Grand-Am

Switching from open-wheel racing to sports cars in 2007, Rojas joined Chip Ganassi Racing to compete in the Grand American Road Racing Rolex Sports Car Series, as a teammate to Scott Pruett. Claiming his first win in the series in 2007, Rojas won his first 24 Hours of Daytona endurance race the following year with co-drivers Pruett, Juan Pablo Montoya and Dario Franchitti. The victory propelled Rojas and Pruett to the Rolex Sports Car Series championship that year, setting a series record for the most victories in a season with six wins over the course of the year.

In 2009, Rojas would finish second in the Rolex Sports Car Series championship standings, only six points out of first place at the end of the year, before returning in 2010 to once again win the series championship partnered with Pruett. Over the course of the year Rojas set another series record for most victories in a season with nine, and finished on the podium eleven times in twelve races.

Rojas' 2011 season started with a co-victory, partnered with Pruett, Graham Rahal and Joey Hand, in the 24 Hours of Daytona, his second win in the event.

On the 51st edition of the 24 Hours of Daytona on January 26–27, 2013 Memo Rojas got the first place, winning his third 24 Hours of Daytona, along with his co-drivers Juan Pablo Montoya, Scott Pruett and Charlie Kimball.

12 Hours of Sebring

On the 62nd edition of the 12 Hours of Sebring on March 15, 2014, Memo Rojas Jr., from Telmex Ganassi Riley Mk XXVI-Ford EcoBoost DP team won the second round of the new United SportsCar Championship by just under five seconds as nine cars in the Prototype class finished on the lead lap. Along with his co-drivers Scott Pruett and Marino Franchitti, Rojas Jr., become the first Mexican to achieve a victory in the 12 Hours of Sebring.

Racing record

Racing career summary 

† As Rojas was a guest driver, he was ineligible to score points.

* Season still in progress.

American Open-Wheel racing results
(key) (Races in bold indicate pole position, races in italics indicate fastest race lap)

Barber Dodge Pro Series

Atlantic Championship

Rolex Sports Car Series (Grand-Am)
(key)

♯ Did not complete 30 minutes drive time. No driver's points awarded.

24 Hours of Daytona

WeatherTech SportsCar Championship
(key)(Races in bold indicate pole position, Results are overall/class)

12 Hours of Sebring

24 Hours of Le Mans results

European Le Mans Series Results

‡ Half points awarded as less than 75% of race distance was completed.

Complete FIA World Endurance Championship results
(key) (Races in bold indicate pole position) (Races in italics indicate fastest lap)

* Season still in progress.

References

External links

Living people
1981 births
Racing drivers from Mexico City
Mexican racing drivers
24 Hours of Daytona drivers
24 Hours of Le Mans drivers
Rolex Sports Car Series drivers
Atlantic Championship drivers
Formula Renault V6 Eurocup drivers
Mexican Formula Three Championship drivers
Formula Ford drivers
Barber Pro Series drivers
WeatherTech SportsCar Championship drivers
12 Hours of Sebring drivers
U.S. F2000 National Championship drivers
FIA World Endurance Championship drivers
European Le Mans Series drivers
Chip Ganassi Racing drivers
DAMS drivers
G-Drive Racing drivers
DragonSpeed drivers
Greaves Motorsport drivers
Signature Team drivers